Domki (alternatively spelled: Domki / Doomki /Domkhi / Doomkhi) is a Baloch tribe in Balochistan.

Notable people
 Mir Sarfraz Chakar Domki, member, Provincial Assembly of Balochistan, Pakistan
 Chakar Khan Domki, member of parliament

References

Surnames
Social groups of Pakistan
Baloch tribes